Sunil Chhetri is an Indian professional footballer who represents the India national football team as a forward. The current captain of the India national team, he is the country's all-time top goal scorer and most-capped player. As of 27 September 2022, he has scored 84 goals in 131 official international appearances since his debut on 12 June 2005 against Pakistan.

On 9 December 2011, Chhetri netted twice in a match (also known as a brace) in India's 3–1 semi-final win over the Maldives in the 2011 SAFF Championship to take his tally to 31, thus becoming his country's all-time leading goalscorer and surpassing the 29 set by I. M. Vijayan. With his 84 international goals, he is currently the third-highest international goalscorer among active players, behind only Cristiano Ronaldo and Lionel Messi. He is also the highest active goalscorer from Asia. On 5 September 2019, Chhetri scored the only goal for India in a 2–1 defeat against Oman in 2022 FIFA World Cup qualifiers to take his tally to 72 international goals, thus becoming the fifth-highest international goalscorer from Asia of all time. His tally of 84 puts him as the fifth-highest goalscorer jointly with Ferenc Puskás in the history of international football. After guiding India to 2–0 victory with his brace against Bangladesh on 7 June 2021, he levelled with the record set by I. M. Vijayan for the most goals scored by an Indian in the FIFA World Cup qualifiers.

Chhetri scored his first ever international goal during his first ever international appearance on 12 June 2005 against Pakistan. Chhetri's first international tournament for India was the 2007 Nehru Cup where he scored four goals in total: two against Cambodia, one against Syria, and one against Kyrgyzstan, which helped India to win their first Nehru Cup title. Chhetri's 50th goal came during his 88th match in a 3–2 victory against Maldives in the 2015 SAFF Championship semi-final on 31 December 2015. He is the only Indian footballer to have scored 50 or more international goals. Between all of his 84 goals: 18 came in SAFF Championship matches, 17 came in friendlies, 11 came in Intercontinental Cup, 9 in FIFA World Cup qualifiers, 9 in the Nehru Cup, 8 in AFC Asian Cup qualifiers, 4 in AFC Asian Cup finals, 1 in the King's Cup, and the rest have come in the AFC Challenge Cup finals and its qualifiers. Chhetri has scored three international hat-tricks, the most by any Indian and has scored braces on sixteen occasions. He has scored more times against Maldives and Nepal than any other team, with eight goals against each. He has also scored eleven international goals at Jawaharlal Nehru Stadium in New Delhi, his most at a single ground. He has scored 12 out of his 84 goals from penalty kicks.

Goals 

Score and results list India's goal tally first, score column indicates score after Chhetri's goal.

Hat-tricks

Statistics

Footnotes

See also 

List of top international men's football goal scorers by country
List of men's footballers with 50 or more international goals
List of men's footballers with 100 or more international caps
List of India national football team hat-tricks

References

External links 
 
 

Chhetri
Chhetri